The  (ISPP) is an international school in Mean Chey Section, Phnom Penh and  Cambodia. It is a private, non-profit, English language, coeducational day school that offers educational program from Early Years (3 years of age) through Grade 12. The school was founded in 1989. Enrollment in 2018-19 is approximately 850 students who represent more than 50 countries.

History
ISPP was started in 1989 by a group of families working for NGOs (non-government organization). The first six students, aged three to seven, met part-time in a home taught by a parent.

In 1990, a villa was rented and ISPP took the first real steps to become a normal day school. A curriculum was developed and a Kindergarten to Grade 4 program was set in place. Student numbers gradually increased at the start of the school year reaching 11 pupils. ISPP's Charter was then written and approved, establishing it as a parent-owned and operated non-sectarian non-profit school.

By 1995, the full-time expatriate faculty numbered 14 and the student body 230. In February, following in-service training, the school developed an innovative approach to effectively meet the needs of the EAL learners at ISPP. A Biology laboratory was established for the secondary school along with the continued expansion of the Computer Lab and the Media Center.

Early in 1996, a formal learning support program was developed and a full-time learning support teacher was employed later that year. A strategic plan was also developed for the integration of technology into the ISPP curriculum. A technology committee was established to facilitate this plan.

In 1998 the school was a K-8 school with 30 students. That year Finansa Ltd had offered that ISPP take over a school owned by the company, International School of Cambodia (ISC), but according to the company, ISPP declined.

In 1998-99, the school presented for its final international accreditation with the Western Association of Schools and Colleges (WASC) following three years' provisional accreditation. The full accreditation visit took place in March 1999 and in May, the school was told that it had received a full 6-year accreditation at its first attempt. ISPP had then become the only fully internationally accredited school in Cambodia at the time.

In 1999-2000, the decision to become an IB World School was taken. The International Baccalaureate Organization carried out an authorization visit and approved the school as an IB Diploma school. in 2001, the school was also authorized to offer the Middle Years Programme (MYP) of the IB. The authorization for the IB Primary Years Programme was given in September 2004.

During the academic year of 2004-05, the school was also accredited by the CIS and the WASC.

Finally, in 2009-10, the faculty produced a comprehensive self-study for the joint 5-year CIS/WASC/IB accreditation visit, which took place in April 2010.

In 2014, the Secondary school moved to a new, purpose-built campus south of the city centre. The Elementary school joined in 2015, and both schools were housed on a single campus for the first time.

Campus
Its current campus is on Hun Neang Boulevard, in Mean Chey Section.

The former campus of ISPP was in Boeung Keng Kang I, Chamkar Mon Section (now in Khan Boeng Keng Kang since 2019).

Organization
The school operates under an agreement with the Royal Government of Cambodia through the Ministry of Education, Youth and Sport.

Curriculum
ISPP is an International Baccalaureate World School, offering the three IB programmes - Primary Years, Middle Years and Diploma Programmes. The school’s Early Years Programme (pre-Kindergarten) is part of the PYP. Music, art, computer studies, physical education, swimming, and Khmer language classes are part of the curriculum for all grades. ISPP provides learning support, EAL support and counselling services. The school runs an after-school program with a range of activities and language options. The School is fully accredited by the Western Association of Schools and Colleges and is a member of the Council of International Schools (CIS), European Council of International Schools (ECIS) and East Asia Regional Council of Overseas Schools (EARCOS).

The school year consists of 2 semesters, each of 2 terms, extending from early August to mid-December and from early January to early-June.

Faculty
In the 2018-19 school year, there were 87 full-time and 12 part-time faculty members. The faculty is multinational and the vast majority come from Australia, Canada, New Zealand, the United Kingdom and the United States.

Facilities
Since 2015, the school has been located completely on a purpose-built campus on Hun Neang Boulevard, Phnom Penh. The 6-hectare campus includes an Olympic-sized swimming pool, a 430 seat theatre, two libraries, a cafeteria and cafe, three basketball courts and full-sized football pitch/sports fields. Classroom facilities include well-equipped science labs, music and art rooms, computer and media labs, and a design and technology workshop.

Finances
In 2018-19, the tuition rates were as follows:

 Early Years 1: US$6,850
 Early Years 2: US$8,590
 Kindergarten to Grade 5: US$16,919
 Grades 6-10: US$20,398
 Grades 11-12: US$22,029

Additionally, there are capital fees per year, which range from $900 - $2,210. Enrollment and entrance fees of US$3,000 are charged once.

References

External links
 
 ISPP on Yellow Pages Cambodia
 Map of former and current campuses

Educational institutions established in 1989
1989 establishments in Cambodia
International schools in Phnom Penh
International Baccalaureate schools
MRISA Schools